Polyscias lionnetii is a species of plant in the family Araliaceae. It is endemic to Seychelles.

References

Trees of Seychelles
lionnetii
Critically endangered plants
Endemic flora of Seychelles
Taxonomy articles created by Polbot